Ford Tichborne (1862–1940) was an Irish 20th-century Anglican priest.

Born in County Tyrone in  1862 and educated at Trinity College, Dublin he held the important offices of Chancellor of Armagh Cathedral, Dean of Armagh (1928–1938) and Bishop of Ossory, Ferns and Leighlin (1938–1940).

Having become a Doctor of Divinity (DD), Tichborne died in 1940. There is a memorial to him in the north aisle at St Patrick's Cathedral, Armagh.

References

1862 births
1940 deaths
People from County Tyrone
Alumni of Trinity College Dublin
Bishops of Ossory, Ferns and Leighlin
20th-century Anglican bishops in Ireland
Deans of Armagh